Maque may refer to:

Mexican lacquerware, also known as maque
Mahjong, also known as maque, Chinese tile-based game
Sparrow (TV series), 2016 Chinese TV series

See also
Maque choux, a traditional dish of Louisiana
Maki-e, Japanese lacquer decoration technique